Georgina Rachael Kamsika is a British author of speculative fiction.  Her genres switch between science fiction, horror and fantasy. Her debut novel The Sulphur Diaries was published in November 2011 by Legend Press.

Biography
Born in Rotherham, South Yorkshire, she moved to Nottingham to attend university. Post graduation, she worked at first in E-Learning, specialising in accessibility, before moving on to work on more commercial websites.

She has had several short stories published in numerous magazines or book anthologies. She is a member of the British Science Fiction Association and the Horror Writers Association.  In 2012 she attended the Clarion West Writers Workshop, with tutors such as George R.R. Martin and Chuck Palahniuk. She was a judge for the 2018 and 2019 British Fantasy Awards. She is a member of the Clarion West Evolving Workshop Culture Committee that aims to assess workshop models and improve the overall experience of everyone attending, especially for BIPOC and other marginalised writers. She attended the Toji Cultural Centre for the eight week UNESCO City of Literature Wonju Residency 2022 programme in September and October of 2022.

Works

Novel
 Goddess of the North (2020)
 The Sulphur Diaries (2011)

Short stories
 The Many Deaths of Johnny Silver (2010)
 Our Fathers' Eyes (2010)
 Mission Six (2010)
 Communication (2010)
 Acceptable Suitors (2010)
 Cage the Beast (2010)
 Mother India (2010)
 Oracle (2012)
 Childhood Monsters (2012)
 Altus (2012)
 Dominance (2012)
 Nostalgia (2015)
 Samsara (2018)
 A Confluence of Stars (2020)
 Shadows Dawning (2021)
 With Anger, You Have Left Us (2022)
 The Lady of The Lake (2022)

Anthologies
 Letters from the Dead (2010)
 Five Stop Story: Short Stories to Read in 5 Stops on Your Commute (2011)
 Behind Locked Doors (2012)
 Orbital Hearts (2012)
 Fading Light (2013)
 Alien Sky (2013)
 After the Fall (2015)
 Not So Stories (2018)
 Tales from the Mount (2020)
 The Devourer Below: An Arkham Horror Anthology (2021)
 Selene Quarterly Magazine: The Complete Series (2022)

Essays
 Women Who Are More Than Strong (2014)
 How The British Chose Curry for Their National Dish (2018)

References

External links
 

Year of birth missing (living people)
Living people
People from Rotherham
English science fiction writers
English fantasy writers
English horror writers
Indian science fiction writers